Year 160 (CLX) was a leap year starting on Monday (link will display the full calendar) of the Julian calendar. At the time, it was known as the Year of the Consulship of Atilius and Vibius (or, less frequently, year 913 Ab urbe condita). The denomination 160 for this year has been used since the early medieval period, when the Anno Domini calendar era became the prevalent method in Europe for naming years.

Events

By place

Roman Empire 
 The Antonine Wall is retaken by Roman legions.

By topic

Art and Science 
 In Rome, the manufacturing of soap containing grease, lime and ashes begins. 
 Appian writes Ρωμαικα, known in English as the Roman History, in which he includes the history of each nation conquered up until the moment of its conquest.

Religion 
 The first Buddhist monks arrive in China.
</onlyinclude>

Births 
 Annia Cornificia Faustina Minor, daughter of Marcus Aurelius (d. 212)
 Felician of Foligno, Roman bishop and martyr (d. 250)
 Julia Domna, Roman empress consort (d. 217)
 Marius Maximus, Roman biographer (d. 230)
 Quintus Tineius Sacerdos, Roman politician
 Sextus Empiricus, Greek philosopher (d. 210)

Deaths 
 Marcion of Sinope, founder of Marcionism (approximate date)
 Suetonius, Roman historian and writer (approximate date)

References 

 

als:160er#160